Phoenix Fan Fusion (formerly Phoenix Comicon and Phoenix Comic Fest) is a speculative fiction entertainment and comic book convention held annually in Phoenix, Arizona. It was founded as the Phoenix Cactus Comicon in June 2002, and originally consisted of a one-day six-hour event held in Ahwatukee, Arizona. The convention plays host to comic related panels, programming events, art contests, and autograph signings for all ages. It is a four-day event (Thursday-Sunday) held during the summer at the Phoenix Convention Center in downtown Phoenix. On Thursday evening prior to the official opening of the event, there is a preview for professionals, exhibitors, and select guests pre-registered for all four days.

Originally showcasing comic books, science fiction/fantasy and film/television, and related popular arts, the convention has expanded over the years to include a larger range of pop culture elements, such as horror, anime, manga, animation, toys, collectible card games, video games, webcomics, and fantasy novels. In 2016, the convention set an attendance record of 106,096, and reportedly generates approximately $5 million in revenue for the city of Phoenix. Then-Phoenix Comicon also began to expand programming into the surrounding hotels starting in 2013, including the Hyatt Regency, Marriott Renaissance and Sheraton Phoenix Downtown Hotels.

History and organisation

The first Phoenix Comicon was held in June 2002 as Phoenix Cactus Comicon. It was a one-day convention lasting six hours held at a Best Western in Ahwatukee, Arizona. Admission was $3 per person and there were 432 attendees, along with a few local creators and exhibitors. The following three years, the convention was held at the Glendale Civic Center. The size of the convention and the attendance were doubled from the previous year, and the Sunday morning six-hour length of the convention was maintained. The convention began to bring out some guests from out of state including Spider-Man artist Todd Nauck and comic legend Marv Wolfman. The programming was increased to include Q&A's with guests, how-to workshops, and film trailer presentations.

In 2006, the convention was held at the Mesa Convention Center in Mesa, Arizona, for the first time in its history. It also became a two-day convention, with a Friday preview night, and featured guests such as voice actors Johnny Young Bosche and Greg Ayres. The exhibitor room was dramatically expanded, as was the amount of programming offered. This was the first convention to expand beyond comic books into the greater pop culture community, including anime, manga, sci-Fi, fantasy and cosplay. Over the weekend, there were over 2,600 attendees. From 2007 to 2009, the convention was held in January at the Mesa Convention Center, where attendance jumped past 3,200. The convention first forayed into media guests in 2007, when Feedback, the winner of Stan Lee's Who Wants to Be a Superhero? attended. In 2009, the event was expanded to 3 days, with a Thursday preview night. It was also announced at the 2009 convention that due to an overwhelming attendance of around 7,000 people that year, the convention in 2010 would be moved to the Phoenix Convention Center the next year and that the dates would be moved to the end of May.

Starting in 2010, the convention was held on Memorial Day weekend at the Phoenix Convention Center and Grand Hyatt Hotel in Phoenix. This change was due to the large increase in attendance and the availability of funds to hold the convention in a larger venue. Increasingly popular celebrities such as Leonard Nimoy, George Takei, and Stan Lee also attended the convention as special guests. One of the highlights of the 2013 event included the world premiere of "Pilgrim of Eternity", the first full-length episode of the award-winning Star Trek Continues fan film web series and a sequel to "Who Mourns for Adonais?". In 2014, due to a scheduling conflict, the convention was moved to the first week of June as opposed to Memorial Day weekend. The convention also expanded its presence into the South and West buildings of the convention center, as well as nearby hotels including the Hyatt Regency Hotel, Marriott Renaissance Hotel and Sheraton Phoenix Downtown Hotel. The 2015 and 2016 convention took place the weekend after Memorial Day weekend at the Phoenix Convention Center, and further utilized the convention facilities, including expanding to the third level ballroom in order to accommodate a larger amount of attendees for popular media guests.

Beginning in 2017, the convention again took place on Memorial Day weekend at the Phoenix Convention Center, with the same being true through 2022.

On May 25, 2017, the first day of the 2017 convention, a man was arrested at the convention after posting his intent to kill police officers to Facebook and was found in possession of several firearms and knives. The man believed he was the Punisher, and intended to kill bad police officers, along with actor Jason David Frank, who was attending the convention as a guest. Security changes were made to the event, including a ban on prop weapons resembling any sort of gun which included those constructed from cardboard and foam. Other prop weapons needed to be deemed safe by security. Although vendors were still allowed to sell toy weapons, they were to be sealed and to be taken off the premises immediately after purchase. These new rules resulted in the cancellation of several panels focused on making prop weapons. The attendance for the convention declined steadily in the following days.

In January 2018, the convention was renamed Phoenix Comic Fest. This was done to avoid use of the term "comic con", which is a response to San Diego Comic-Con International lawsuit. In 2018, bracelets were given to attendees in place of laminated passes. On the Saturday of the con, a fire alarm caused an evacuation just before 8 pm; many attendees stayed just outside the convention center. At 9:30 p.m., it was determined to be a false alarm, but what was left of the scheduling for Saturday night had to be cancelled and rescheduled for safety reasons. The following morning the convention announced that attendees who had purchased a Saturday pass would be able to obtain a Sunday pass as compensation for Saturday's incident. The convention hours were extended as well. During the 2018 convention, it was announced that the convention would again be renamed in 2019 to Phoenix Fan Fusion.

The 2020 Phoenix Fan Fusion was cancelled due to the COVID-19 pandemic. It was initially deferred to 2021 but then rescheduled for January 2022. However, in September 2021, due to uncertainties surrounding Delta variant of COVID-19, Phoenix Fan Fusion was once again postponed to May 2022.

Events

Along with panels, seminars, and workshops with comic book professionals, evenings at the convention include events such as themed prom parties, the annual Masquerade costume contest, and a Film Festival with several different prize opportunities.

In 2014, Phoenix Comicon also began a partnership with NASA, allowing attendees to participate in the FameLab program, as well as hear from NASA representatives at various panels throughout the convention. Phoenix Comicon also partnered with media guests and entertainers to offer special events outside the convention, including a performance by Brian Posehn, Myq Kaplan, and Mike Drucker for their comedy group Comedy Mutant, as well as a one-man performance of Star Wars, presented by Charlie Ross.

Like most comics conventions, Phoenix Fan Fusion features a large floor space for exhibitors. These exhibitors include media companies, as well as comic-book dealers and collectibles merchants. The exclusive collectibles sold include merchandise of licensed movie, comic book, and animation characters. Also like most comics conventions, Phoenix Fan Fusion includes an autograph and photo opportunity area, as well as the Artists' Alley, where comics artists can sign autographs and provide free or paid sketches.

For the first time ever, Phoenix Comicon held a separate event in December 2014, titled Phoenix Comicon Fan Fest, at the University of Phoenix Stadium in Glendale, Arizona. The convention functioned as a smaller version of Phoenix Comicon, maintaining its usual elements of panels, workshops, and exhibitors, while expanding its focus on comic book artists, and fan interaction with its various media guests. Convention organizers stated that they saw a desire from their audience to host a convention in Arizona during the winter, but due to the costs involved with renting the Phoenix Convention Center and blocking off rooms at nearby hotels, the decision was made to host the Fan Fest in Glendale at the University of Phoenix Stadium. Several television and media guests attended the first ever Fan Fest, including David Ramsey, Colin Baker, and Michael Biehn among others, including several dozen comic book artists and creators. In 2016, the Fan Fest was moved to the Phoenix Convention Center, and took place in October, rather than December. The Fan Fest event was officially canceled by Square Egg Entertainment in June 2018.

Locations and dates

Phoenix Fan Fusion/Comicon/Comic Fest

Phoenix Fan Fest

References

External links

Phoenix Fan Fusion Official Website

Multigenre conventions
Festivals in Phoenix, Arizona
Recurring events established in 2002
Comics conventions in the United States
Tourist attractions in Phoenix, Arizona
2002 establishments in Arizona
Conventions in Arizona